Wallace D. "Wally" McRae (born February 26, 1936) is an American rancher, cowboy, cowboy poet and philosopher. He runs the  Rocker Six Cattle Co. ranch on Rosebud Creek, south of Rosebud, Montana.

Biography
McRae is a third-generation rancher, his family members having raised cattle and sheep in southeastern Montana since 1885.

He attended grade school and high school in nearby Colstrip, Montana. He graduated from Montana State University in 1958 with a degree in zoology and  chemistry. After college, he was commissioned by the United States Navy and served in both the Atlantic and Mediterranean fleets. Following the death of his father in 1960, McRae returned to Montana with his wife Ruth Hayes to take over the family ranching operations.

Career
McRae recalls having recited his first poem at age 4, at the one-room schoolhouse attended by his sisters. Since then, he has published more than 100 poems on topics both humorous and romantic, as well as matters of social concern such as environmental protection.

As a poet, McRae is considered a "fixture at national cowboy poet gatherings" and is "internationally known for his poem 'Reincarnation' ". As of 2015, McRae has been an invited performer at every Elko Cowboy Poetry Gathering.

The American journalist Charles Kuralt discusses McRae's efforts to preserve the land and the cowboy way of life in a small community in his book, Charles Kuralt's America. The poem "Things of Intrinsic Worth" appears with the interview in the Kuralt book.  McRae was the subject of a segment on the American TV newsmagazine series 60 Minutes and he read his poetry in a 1999 episode of the PBS series P.O.V. His poems have been included in many anthologies of cowboy poetry. In addition, McRae wrote the foreword to a collection of cowboy poetry published in 2000.

Awards and honors
 1989: Governor's Award for the Arts in Montana 
 1990: National Heritage Fellowship from the National Endowment for the Arts 
 Nominated by President Bill Clinton to serve on the National Council of the Arts
 1999: The Missoulian listed McRae as number 42 in the Most Influential Montanans of the Century
 2009: Montana Book of the Year award for Stick Horses
 2020: Inducted into the Montana Cowboy Hall of Fame, with the Living Award
 H.G. Merriam Award, University of Montana Mansfield Library

Published works
Stick Horses and Other Stories of Ranch Life (2009)
Cowboy Curmudgeon and Other Poems (1992)
Things of Intrinsic Worth: Poems (1989)
It's Just Grass & Water: Poems (1986)
Up North is Down the Crick: Poems (1985)

References

External links
McRae feature includes text of five poems, including "Reincarnation" and "Things of Intrinsic Worth"
Short film on McRae, including his recitation of "Things of Intrinsic Worth"

1936 births
American male poets
Culture of the Western United States
Living people
People from Rosebud County, Montana
Cowboys
Cowboy poets
National Heritage Fellowship winners
20th-century American poets
21st-century American poets
Montana State University alumni
20th-century American male writers
21st-century American male writers